Ulf Kämpfer (born 16 June 1972) is a German politician of the Social Democratic Party of Germany (SPD) who has been serving as the Lord Mayor of Kiel since March 2014.

Education and early career
Kämpfer was born Eutin, West Germany. After his graduation in Plön, he studied jurisprudence and philosophy at the University of Göttingen and the National University of Ireland in Galway. For two years, he worked as a research assistant in the German Bundestag. After further studies at Humboldt University in Berlin and Columbia University in New York City, he graduated with a doctorate in 2004 with his comparative law thesis Self-determination people wishing to die: Euthanasia in German and American Constitutional Law (German: Die Selbstbestimmung Sterbewilliger: Sterbehilfe im deutschen und amerikanischen Verfassungsrecht) in Berlin. At the same time, he passed the second state examination.

From 2004 to 2008, Kämpfer worked in the state ministries for environmental issues, agriculture and justice of Schleswig-Holstein. In 2008, he entered the judicial service and was appointed a judge of an Amtsgericht in Kiel in 2010. Prior to his appointment as Secretary of State in the cabinet of Minister-President Torsten Albig on 12 June 2012, he was also an associate to the Higher Regional Court of Schleswig.

Political career
From 2012 to 2014, Kämpfer served as State Secretary in the State Ministry of Energy Transition, Agriculture, Environment and Rural Areas of Schleswig-Holstein, under the leadership of minister Robert Habeck.

General meetings of the three parties agreed on 14 December 2013. At the general meeting of the SPD, he was chosen with three abstentions and no votes against. The Greens and the SSW elected him unanimously with no abstentions and votes against. On 23 March 2014, he was elected with 63.1% of the vote as new mayor of Kiel.

Other activities
 Förde Sparkasse, Ex-Officio Chairman of the Supervisory Board
 Kiel Week, Ex-Officio Chairman of the Supervisory Board
 MVV Energie, Member of the Advisory Board
 Stadtwerke Kiel, Member of the Advisory Board

Personal life
Kämpfer lives with his wife, Green politician , and their son in the Hassee district of Kiel.

Further reading 
 Die Selbstbestimmung Sterbewilliger. Sterbehilfe im deutschen und amerikanischen Verfassungsrecht (= Schriften zum internationalen Recht. Bd. 154). Duncker und Humblot, Berlin 2005,  (zugl.: Dissertation, Humboldt-Universität zu Berlin, Berlin 2004).

References

External links 
 Official website of Dr. Ulf Kämpfer
 Homepage: Ulf Kämpfer

Mayors of places in Schleswig-Holstein
1972 births
Social Democratic Party of Germany politicians
Living people